Panketal is a municipality in the district of Barnim, in Brandenburg, Germany. It is situated 15 km northeast of Berlin (centre).

History 
Panketal emerged in 2003 by merging the municipalities Zepernick and Schwanebeck. Since 1996, the population increased by 52.8%.

Demography

Recreation 
In 2006 a ropes course has been set up in the district Hobrechtsfelde. The ropes course has some 20 different training units. It was subsidized by Panketal with a total sum of 150,000 €.

References

External links 
 Official Website (German)
 demographic report by Bertelsmann-Foundation (pdf, German)

Localities in Barnim